Nicola Loud (born 1975) is a British violinist who, in 1990 at the age of 15, became BBC Young Musician of the Year.

Early life and career
She studied at the Royal Academy of Music with her principal tutor György Pauk who described her as: "Very musical, with fantastic flair and presence - one of the most talented British violinists I had ever come across.".

From London she went to study in New York City with Cho-Liang Lin at the Juilliard School of Music. Loud has performed as a soloist with most of the major UK orchestras and also performs chamber music.   In 2001 she created her one-woman show which features a wide range of repertoire including classical, jazz and film music.

In 2003, Nicola Loud was awarded an ARAM by the Royal Academy of Music and in 2008 became a television presenter for the BBC, co-hosting the concerto final of BBC Young Musician of the Year in Cardiff. As a past winner, she was also featured in a documentary celebrating 30 years of the competition, and provided the commentary for the Eurovision Young Musicians 2008 program on BBC Four.

Personal life
In 2012, Loud married Rupert Allason, who writes about espionage under the pen name Nigel West.

References

External links

British classical violinists
1975 births
Living people
Alumni of the Royal Academy of Music
Juilliard School alumni
21st-century classical violinists